Deborah Levi (born 28 August 1997) is a German bobsledder.

She won a bronze medal at the IBSF World Championships 2021 and a gold medal in the 2022 Winter Olympics in the two-woman event.

References

External links

Deborah Levi at the German Bobsleigh, Luge, and Skeleton Federation 

1997 births
Living people
German female bobsledders
People from Dillenburg
Sportspeople from Giessen (region)
Bobsledders at the 2022 Winter Olympics
Olympic bobsledders of Germany
Olympic gold medalists for Germany
Medalists at the 2022 Winter Olympics
Olympic medalists in bobsleigh
21st-century German women